Club Lagoons is a Maldivian football club based in Malé, Maldives. They are one of the leading teams in Maldives during the 1980s and 1990s. They were relegated to 2nd division in 1996. In 1997, they competed in 2nd division, but, unable to get promoted and regain top flight status, the team never competed again.

Memorable moments
 Maldives National Championship: 1989
 Maldives National Championship League Championship: 1989
 Maldives FA Cup Champion: 1990, 1992, runners-up: 1991, 1993

Achievements
Maldives National Championship: 1
 1989
Maldives FA Cup: 2
 1990, 1992

Performance in AFC competitions
Asian Club Championship: 1 appearance
1990–91: Qualifying Stage

Asian Cup Winners Cup: 1 appearance
1994–95: Preliminary Round

Former players

  Kim Nørholt

External links
Football Association of Maldives

Football clubs in the Maldives
Football clubs in Malé
Association football clubs established in 1982
1982 establishments in the Maldives